Henry Percy Dockrell (27 December 1914 – 22 November 1979) was an Irish Fine Gael politician who served for twenty years as a Teachta Dála (TD).

Dockrell first stood as a Fine Gael candidate for the Dún Laoghaire and Rathdown constituency at the 1948 general election. He was unsuccessful, but was elected at the 1951 general election, and was re-elected at the 1954 general election. He was defeated at the 1957 general election, but regained his seat at the 1961 general election and was re-elected a further three times for the same constituency. The constituency was divided for the 1977 general election. He stood as a candidate for Dún Laoghaire but was not elected.

His father Henry Morgan Dockrell and his brother Maurice E. Dockrell were also Fine Gael TDs. His grandfather Sir Maurice Dockrell had been a Unionist MP before independence. On 24 September 1942 he married Dorothy Wadsworth Brooks. Percy Dockrell's two sons, John H. Dockrell and William Dockrell, served as councillors on the Corporation of Dún Laoghaire, and in William's case on its successor Dún Laoghaire–Rathdown County Council.

See also
Families in the Oireachtas

References

1914 births
1979 deaths
Fine Gael TDs
Members of the 14th Dáil
Members of the 15th Dáil
Members of the 17th Dáil
Members of the 18th Dáil
Members of the 19th Dáil
Members of the 20th Dáil
Irish Anglicans
Irish solicitors